Heliconia sclerotricha is a species of plant in the family Heliconiaceae. It is endemic to Ecuador.

References

External links
 Heliconia sclerotricha observations on iNaturalist

Flora of Ecuador
sclerotricha
Near threatened plants
Taxonomy articles created by Polbot